Microsyagrus recticollis is a species of leaf beetle from the Democratic Republic of the Congo, described by Maurice Pic in 1949.

References

Eumolpinae
Beetles of the Democratic Republic of the Congo
Beetles described in 1949
Taxa named by Maurice Pic
Endemic fauna of the Democratic Republic of the Congo